Feyay (also Romanized as Feyāy; also known as Beyt-e Fīāy, Sādāt Fāz̧el-e Do, and Şāder ‘Oqūb) is a village in Seyyed Abbas Rural District, Shavur District, Shush County, Khuzestan Province, Iran. At the 2006 census, its population was 458, in 75 families.

References 

Populated places in Shush County